Fashion Impression Function is a 2001 EP by Freezepop. Tracks 5, 7, 8 and 9 are remix versions of songs found on the band's previous album Freezepop Forever. The Mastermind mix of the song "Manipulate" later appeared on the album Fancy Ultra•Fresh.

Fashion Impression Function was re-released in 2007 with a new Digipack case, a remastered recording, and two extra songs.

Track listing
Original release2007 Reissue

Personnel

Performance 
Freezepop:
 The Duke of Candied Apples
 Liz Enthusiasm
 Sean T. Drinkwater

References

External links 
 Freezepop.net

2001 EPs
Freezepop albums
2007 remix albums
2001 remix albums
Remix EPs